C. P. Spencer (born Crathman Plato Spencer, January 13, 1938 – October 20, 2004) was an American musician, singer, songwriter and record producer for the Motown label in the late 1960s and early 1970s. He was a native of Detroit, Michigan. Best known for being a member of the Motown quartet The Originals. He was also an original member of both The Spinners and The Voice Masters.

C.P. Spencer died from a heart attack on October 20, 2004. As of April 2013, Originals' Hank Dixon is now the only surviving, and active, founding member of that original group; Spinners' Henry Fambrough is now the only surviving, and active, founding member of that group; Dixon is also the only surviving member of the Voice Masters.

References

External links
The Spinners interview by Pete Lewis, 'Blues & Soul' 02/09
The Originals on SoulExpress

1938 births
2004 deaths
American soul singers
Motown artists
Singers from Detroit
20th-century American singers
The Originals (band) members
20th-century American male singers
The Spinners (American group) members